A public instrument is any legal instrument (legal document) recorded with and authenticated by a public office or employee. To carry weight, any such instrument, must be genuine and authentic. Public instruments consequently must bear the name, title, and seal of the official that issued them, and should be written in the presence of witnesses who attested to them.

A public instrument is generally admissible in evidence without the necessity of preliminary proof of its authenticity and due execution. In other words, public instruments are self-authenticating documentary evidence. A presumption of regularity and validity attaches to public instruments; for the instrument to be rebutted, it must be proven in court to contain a willful material error.

Typical types of public instruments include:
 State and federal laws
 Laws of foreign nations
 Vital records
 Legislative acts
 Acts of statute (acts of Parliament or Congress)
 Subordinate legislation
 Judicial instruments
 Judgments, orders, and decrees
 Court writs or process
 Court records
 Rules of court
 notarial acts
 Municipal and county charters
 Ordinances and resolutions of municipalities
 Administrative agency rules
 Items under official governmental seal
 Patents, authentication certificates, apostilles, etc.
 Any deed or formal agreement recorded and filed with a government register or records office
 Title-deeds, conveyances, wills, company charters, public inventories, etc.

Civil and Scots law
Public instruments at civil law are generally known as public instruments (Germ: öffentliche Urkunde, Fr: acte public, Sp: instrumento público) and under Scots law as probative or self-proving instruments.  These categories refer more to the level of evidenciary validity given an instrument in court.  Under these legal systems, to be received as a public instrument, a document must be subjected to a number of conditions. These include:
 Execution before two or more witnesses, or before an authorized civil-law notary or public officer
 Testified by a public seal
 Rendered public by the authority of a competent judicial officer
 Certified as a copy of a public register. 
Any such instrument is said to prove itself, that is, it has the privilege of being free from challenge or rebuttal at court.

See also
Evidence (law)
Minute of Agreement
Vital record

Notes

Civil law (common law)
Public sphere